The Ebbw Vale Garden Festival Funicular was a funicular railway built to carry visitors around the Ebbw Vale Garden Festival in 1992.

Festival 
The Ebbw Vale Garden Festival of 1992 was the last of the series of British National Garden Festivals from the mid-1980s to early '90s, funded by central government under Michael Heseltine in a bread and circuses plan to distract from the closures of major heavy industries in the regions; the same industries whose sites would form the location for most of the festivals.

Ebbw Vale was chosen as waste land which had been the British Steel Corporation's Ebbw Vale Steelworks, closed and partially demolished in the early 1980s. Work began in 1989 and the festival ran from 1 May 1992 and until October. As well as gardens, plant exhibitions and fairground-style attractions the festival also featured a funicular railway.

Engineering 

The route meandered in a rough S shape, so that passengers on both sides could see the view across the site. The  gauge cars were open-sided, with toast-rack seating. The two trains each had three  cars and could seat 96 people. Gradients were 1:9 overall, with a maximum of 1:5 and flat areas at the end stations and passing loop. With a journey time of 4 minutes, it could move a target maximum of 1,000 people per hour.

The track layout was a conventional two rail funicular with a central passing loop. The points were fixed and the outside wheels of each car were double-flanged, to guide the cars through the loop. Operation was with a single loop winding cable and semi-balanced trains, but unusually the electric winding drum was at the lower station. If unbalanced in the descending direction, the winding motor could be used for regenerative braking and fed electricity back into the site supply, an advanced feature for the early '90s. The stations were unstaffed and the automatic control was started via radio by the driver of the descending car.

The funicular was the first to be built in the UK since 1902. Its track and rolling stock was British-built by WGH Engineering of Old Edlington, who were in the coal-mining area near Doncaster and experienced in cable railways. It cost around £700,000 (£ in  money) to build.

Legacy 
At the close of the festival the funicular was offered for sale at around £200,000 but it is understood there was no sale and it was scrapped on site.

The Festival Park site is identifiable today but little of the festival infrastructure remains. The lakes at the lower part of the site are the most obvious relic. The upper end of the funicular is now a retail park.

Of the five National Garden Festivals, none of them saw the hoped-for boom in development immediately after closure. Those closest to a busy urban area, particularly Gateshead, did see some housing development but in all cases this was driven by pre-existing local economic strength, rather than any long-term planning around the festival, or any knock-on benefits. In many cases, it was nearly 20 years before anything like the full site was under development.

See also 
 Ebbw Vale Cableway

References 

Funicular railways in Wales
Garden Festival Funicular
3 ft 6 in gauge railways in Wales
Defunct funicular railways